Colopea xerophila is a species of spider in the genus Colopea found in New Guinea.

Description
Male length:  4.5 mm

Female length:  5.0 mm

References

Stenochilidae
Spiders described in 1982
Spiders of Asia